Miminiska Airport  is a registered aerodrome located on Lake Miminska, near Miminiska Ontario, Canada.

See also
Miminiska Water Aerodrome

References

Registered aerodromes in Kenora District